Fumago is a genus of fungi belonging to the family Capnodiaceae.

The species of this genus are found in Europe and Northern America.

Species:
 Fumago crustacea 
 Fumago donatiae 
 Fumago fungicola 
 Fumago graminis 
 Fumago hebbalensis 
 Fumago ilicis 
 Fumago lateritiorum 
 Fumago lauri 
 Fumago lonicerae 
 Fumago oleae 
 Fumago oosperma 
 Fumago pannosa 
 Fumago sacchari 
 Fumago salicina 
 Fumago setulosa 
 Fumago sorbina 
 Fumago typhae

References

Fungi